Inna De Yard: The Soul of Jamaica is a 2019 music documentary film about Jamaican reggae music, written and directed by Peter Webber. The film is based around the recording of an album in Kingston, Jamaica by Jamaican reggae music veterans. It also "doubles as a capsule history of Jamaican reggae" and shows the band performing the songs at a concert at Le Trianon in Paris.

The musical supergroup, a project also called Inna De Yard, is shown collaborating on recording an acoustic album of old songs by each of the musicians, in Saint Andrew Parish in 2017.

Inna De Yard had its world premiere at Tribeca Film Festival in 2019. It showed at Sydney Film Festival the same year.

Cast
Ken Boothe
Kiddus I
Jah9
Winston McAnuff
Judy Mowatt
Cedric Myton of The Congos
Lloyd Parks

Songs
"Everything I Own" with Ken Boothe

See also
Music of Jamaica

References

External links
 
 
 

2019 films
2019 documentary films
Jamaican documentary films
Films set in Paris
Films shot in Paris
Films set in Jamaica
Films shot in Jamaica
Documentary films about music and musicians
Reggae films
Films directed by Peter Webber
2010s English-language films